Jan Kristiansen (born 22 May 1934) is a Norwegian speed skater.

He represented the club Oslo IL, and competed at the 1956 Winter Olympics, where he placed 16th in the 1,500 metre. His personal best times were: in the 500 metres 44.1 minutes (1957); 1500 metres 2:13.7 minutes (1956); 5000 metres 8:09.0 minutes (1963) and 10000 metres 17:18.3 minutes (1957).

References

1934 births
Living people
Norwegian male speed skaters
Olympic speed skaters of Norway
Speed skaters at the 1956 Winter Olympics